The Walker Island, sometimes also Walker's Island, is a  island located in Bass Strait, lying off the northwest coast of Tasmania, Australia. The island, separated from the Tasmanian mainland by a highly tidal area known as Robbins Passage, lies north of the adjacent Robbins Island.

Access to Walker Island is available via the Walker Island Airport.

The island, together with the adjacent Robbins Island, has been privately owned by the Hammond family since 1961. In 2016 it was reported that the family graze approximately 7,000 head of Wagyu cattle on both islands, and mainland Tasmania.

HMAS Riawe had her commercial origins in the Robbins and Walker Islands prior to her 1942 requisition by the Department of the Navy for duties with the Naval Auxiliary Patrol during World War II.

See also

 List of islands of Tasmania

References

Further reading

Islands of North West Tasmania
Localities of Circular Head Council
Islands of Bass Strait
Private islands of Tasmania